Huang Sui (born 8 January 1982) is a Chinese-Australian female badminton player.

Career
Although Huang has won the Chinese National mixed doubles title almost all of her many international titles have come in women's doubles with Gao Ling, in a partnership where Huang's strength and consistency in the backcourt have complemented Gao's ability in the forecourt. They have captured over thirty top tier events since 2001, sharing dominance at the world level with their Chinese teammates and rivals Yang Wei and Zhang Jiewen. Huang and Gao have been especially successful at the All-England Championships, winning a record six consecutive finals there, three of them over Yang and Zhang, from 2001 through 2006. They reached the final of five consecutive editions of the BWF World Championships; winning in 2001, 2003, and 2006, and finishing second to Yang and Zhang in 2005 and 2007. Huang was a silver medalist with Gao at the 2004 Athens Olympics also won by Yang and Zhang. Neither team figured in the medals at the 2008 Olympics (won by another Chinese pair, Du Jing and Yu Yang). Huang has been a member of China's perennial world champion Uber Cup (women's international) team since 2002. She retired from the sport at the end of the 2007 season and subsequently moved to Sydney, Australia with her husband.

After a long absence from the sport Huang returned to the court in 2012, this time as an Australian.

Achievements

Olympic Games 
Women's doubles

World Championships 
Women's doubles

World Cup 
Women's doubles

Asian Games 
Women's doubles

Asian Championships 
Women's doubles

World Junior Championships 
Girls' doubles

Mixed doubles

Asian Junior Championships 
Girls' doubles

Mixed doubles

BWF Superseries  
The BWF Superseries, launched on 14 December 2006 and implemented in 2007, is a series of elite badminton tournaments, sanctioned by Badminton World Federation (BWF). BWF Superseries has two level such as Superseries and Superseries Premier. A season of Superseries features twelve tournaments around the world, which introduced since 2011, with successful players invited to the Superseries Finals held at the year end.

Women's doubles

 BWF Superseries Finals tournament
 BWF Superseries Premier tournament
 BWF Superseries tournament

BWF Grand Prix 
The BWF Grand Prix has two levels: Grand Prix and Grand Prix Gold. It is a series of badminton tournaments, sanctioned by Badminton World Federation (BWF) since 2007. The World Badminton Grand Prix has been sanctioned by the International Badminton Federation since 1983.

Women's doubles

 BWF Grand Prix Gold tournament
 BWF & IBF Grand Prix tournament

References

External links
 
 

1982 births
Living people
Badminton players from Hunan
Chinese emigrants to Australia
Chinese female badminton players
Australian female badminton players
Badminton players at the 2004 Summer Olympics
Olympic badminton players of China
Olympic silver medalists for China
Olympic medalists in badminton
Medalists at the 2004 Summer Olympics
Badminton players at the 2006 Asian Games
Badminton players at the 2002 Asian Games
Asian Games gold medalists for China
Asian Games silver medalists for China
Asian Games medalists in badminton
Medalists at the 2002 Asian Games
Medalists at the 2006 Asian Games